Benjamin Garuccio (born 15 June 1995) is an Australian professional football (soccer) player who plays as a left back for Western United in the A-league.

Born in Adelaide, Garuccio played youth football at the Australian Institute of Sport before making his professional debut for Melbourne Heart. In 2016, he moved back to Adelaide to play for Adelaide United. Garuccio signed for Scottish club Hearts in May 2018. He returned to Australia in October 2020 with Melbourne City.

Garuccio represented the Australian under-20 side on many occasions.

Career

Melbourne Heart
On 19 September 2012, Garuccio signed for A-League side Melbourne Heart, who have since been rebranded as Melbourne City.

Adelaide United
On 16 June 2016, Garuccio returned to his hometown, signing a 2-year contract with Adelaide United.

Heart of Midlothian
Garuccio signed a pre-contract agreement with Scottish Premiership club Hearts in May 2018. He scored his first goal for Hearts in a 5–0 win against Inverness Caledonian Thistle on 29 July 2018, with a 25-yard free-kick.

Melbourne City
Garuccio returned to Australia in October 2020, signing for Melbourne City.

Western United
In July 2021, Garuccio secured a mutual termination of contract with Melbourne City, so he could join rival Melbourne club Western United.

Career statistics

Honours
Melbourne City
 A-League Premiership: 2020–21
 A-League Championship: 2020–21

Western United
 A-League Men Championship: 2021–22

Individual
A-Leagues All Star: 2022
 PFA A-League Men Team of the Season: 2021–22

References

External links

1995 births
Living people
Australian people of Italian descent
Australian soccer players
Soccer players from Adelaide
Association football defenders
Australian Institute of Sport soccer players
A-League Men players
Melbourne City FC players
Adelaide United FC players
Heart of Midlothian F.C. players
Western United FC players
Australia under-20 international soccer players
Australian expatriate soccer players
Expatriate footballers in Scotland
Scottish Professional Football League players